The  2010 Honda Indy Toronto was the second running of the Honda Indy Toronto (it had been conducted for 22 previous years under different sponsorship) and the tenth round of the 2010 IndyCar Series season. It took place on Sunday, July 18, 2010. The race was contested over 85 laps at the  Exhibition Place in Toronto, Ontario.

Classification

Qualifying

Race

References

Indy Toronto
Honda Indy Toronto
Honda Indy Toronto, 2010
Honda Indy Toronto
Honda Indy Toronto